Phelps County Courthouse may refer to:

Phelps County Courthouse (Missouri), Rolla, Missouri
Phelps County Courthouse (Nebraska), Holdrege, Nebraska